Faith: A Hymns Collection is Avalon's tenth release and their seventh studio album.  Their first worship album, it contains remakes of old and modern hymns.  It was released on October 17, 2006.

Reception

Track listing
"The Solid Rock" – 4:12; No lead
"Joyful, Joyful We Adore Thee" – 3:44; No lead
"Great Is Thy Faithfulness" – 4:04; Lead: Janna and Melissa
"In Christ Alone" – 5:04; Lead: Janna (Greg chimes in on v. 2)
"It Is Well with My Soul" – 4:54; Lead: Jody
"I'll Fly Away" – 4:08; Lead: Janna
"Holy! Holy! Holy!" – 1:04; No lead
"Blessed Assurance" – 4:03; No lead
"Jesus Medley: "Jesus Loves Me" / "'Tis So Sweet to Trust in Jesus"" – 5:20; Lead: Jody and Janna ("Jesus Loves Me"), Greg and Melissa ("'Tis So Sweet to Trust in Jesus")
"How Great Thou Art" – 4:51; Lead: Jody and Greg
"Amazing Grace" – 4:58; Lead: Jody and Greg
"Total Praise" – 3:55; Lead: Melissa and Jody
"For Freedom" (Bonus track) – 4:25

Personnel 
Avalon
 Janna Long – vocals
 Jody McBrayer – vocals
 Melissa Greene – vocals
 Greg Long – vocals

Musicians
 Blair Masters – Fender Rhodes, keyboards and programming (1, 3-12), acoustic piano (5)
 Pat Coil – acoustic piano (1, 3, 4, 6-12), Hammond B3 organ (1-12)
 John Hobbs – acoustic piano (2), keyboards (2), programming (2)
 Jamie Kenney – acoustic piano (13), programming (13)
 Shaun Shankel – programming (13)
 John Willis – acoustic guitar (1, 2, 3, 5-12)
 David Cleveland – electric guitar, bouzouki, mandolin, acoustic guitar (4)
 Chuck Butler – electric guitar
 Adam Lester – electric guitar
 Jerry McPherson – electric guitar
 Matt Pierson – bass (1, 3-10, 12)
 Adam Nitti – bass (2)
 Joey Canaday – bass (11)
 Steve Brewster – drums (1, 3-12)
 Dan Needham – drums (2)
 Eric Darken – percussion (1-8, 10-12)
 Tommy Sims – percussion (9)
 John Catchings – cello
 David Davidson – strings (13)
 Michael Mellett – vocal arrangements

Production 
 Producers – Brown Bannister (Tracks 1-12); Shaun Shankel (Track 13).
 Executive Producer – Brad O'Donnell
 Additional Vocal Production on Tracks 1-12 – Michael Mellett
 Recording Engineers – Steve Bishir (Tracks 1-12); Jamie Kenney and Shaun Shankel (Track 13).
 Additional Engineers on Tracks 1-12 – Brown Bannister, Aaron Sternke and Billy Whittington.
 Assistant Engineers on Tracks 1-12 – Jason Lefan and Joe Roberts
 Recorded at The Tracking Room, Platinum Lab and The Lealand Room (Nashville, TN). 
 Overdubbed at Oxford Sound (Nashville, TN) and First Avenue Sound (Franklin, TN).
 Mixing – Steve Bishir (Tracks 1-12); F. Reid Shippen (Track 13).
 Mix Assistant on Track 13 – Lee Bridges
 Mixed at Sound Stage Studios (Nashville, TN).
 Tracks 1-12 mastered by Tom Coyne at Sterling Sound (New York, NY).
 Track 13 mastered by Andrew Mendelson at Georgetown Masters (Nashville, TN).
 A&R Administration – Jess Chambers
 Creative Director – Ian Cook
 Art Direction – Tim Frank
 Design – Torne White
 Photography – Robert Ascroft (band) and Torne White (cover)

Radio Singles
In Christ Alone

References

2006 albums
Avalon (band) albums